The 2004 Pro Bowl was the NFL's all-star game for the 2003 season. The game was played on February 8, 2004, at Aloha Stadium in Honolulu, Hawaii. The final score was NFC 55, AFC 52, the most points scored in a Pro Bowl game. Marc Bulger of the St. Louis Rams was the game's MVP.

Game summary
The AFC's first play set the tone for what would become a high-scoring affair. Tennessee Titans quarterback Steve McNair faked a handoff to running back Jamal Lewis before throwing to Chad Johnson for a 90-yard touchdown pass, the third-longest scoring play in Pro Bowl history. After the NFC got the ball back, they were forced to punt after a three-and-out. However, the punt by Todd Sauerbrun was blocked, and Ed Reed of the Ravens recovered it and ran it into the end zone, giving the AFC a 14–0 lead early on. The NFC responded with a touchdown by Seahawks running back Shaun Alexander, and Jeff Wilkins kicked a field goal to bring the NFC to within four. After Mike Vanderjagt kicked a field goal of his own, the score at the end of the first quarter was 17–10 AFC. Peyton Manning came on for the AFC at the second quarter, and hit Colts teammate Marvin Harrison with a 50-yard strike, as well as another touchdown pass to Tony Gonzalez. Wilkins kicked another field goal for the NFC, and the halftime score was 31–13 in favor of the AFC.

The AFC continued to add onto their lead with a Jamal Lewis touchdown, putting the score at 38–13. However, Marc Bulger, who had taken over at NFC quarterback from Daunte Culpepper, threw two quick touchdown passes to Torry Holt and Keenan McCardell, to bring the score to 38–27 at the end of three. Once again, the AFC struck quickly at the start of a quarter, when Trent Green hit Clinton Portis with a 22-yard touchdown pass. With less than 14 minutes remaining in the game, the score was 45–27.

Bulger quickly threw a scoring pass to tight end Alge Crumpler, and a short time later hit Alexander with another touchdown pass. Although the two-point conversion attempt after Alexander's touchdown failed, the score was still 45–40 with just over five minutes to play. Just after that, Dré Bly picked off Manning and returned the interception for a touchdown, giving the NFC the lead for the first time in the game. Counting the successful two-point conversion after Bly's touchdown, the NFC had scored 18 points in 8 minutes. Alexander scored another rushing touchdown with three and a half minutes remaining to add to the NFC's lead.  Manning, however, responded with a touchdown pass to Hines Ward, and the AFC was down by three. Safety Brock Marion picked off Bulger in the end zone and ran it back to the AFC's 22-yard line. Manning had 1:15 left on the clock and no timeouts. After two passes to his favorite target, Harrison, as well as another to Ward, the AFC found itself on the NFC's 21-yard line. Kris Jenkins sacked Manning to send the AFC back, though, and with six seconds left, Vanderjagt, who hadn't missed a kick (field goal or extra point) all season, was wide right on a 51-yard attempt.

The game set several records. Ironically, the AFC's total of 31 points in the first half was a Pro Bowl record, but wouldn't last the game, as the NFC responded by putting up 42 points in the second half.

Scoring summary
1st Quarter
AFC – Chad Johnson 90-yard pass from Steve McNair (Mike Vanderjagt kick), 12:25. AFC 7–0. Drive: 1 play, 90 yards, 0:15.
AFC – Ed Reed 23-yard blocked punt return (Mike Vanderjagt kick), 11:02. AFC 14–0.
NFC – Shaun Alexander 12-yard run (Jeff Wilkins kick), 7:29. AFC 14–7. Drive: 4 yards, 70 yards, 3:33.
NFC – Jeff Wilkins 28-yard field goal, 2:52. AFC 14–10. Drive: 6 plays, 60 yards, 3:22.
AFC – Mike Vanderjagt 27-yard field goal, 0:11. AFC 17–10. Drive: 7 plays, 77 yards, 2:41.
2nd Quarter
NFC – Jeff Wilkins 38-yard field goal, 10:07. AFC 17–13. Drive: 6 plays, 34 yards, 2:16.
AFC – Marvin Harrison 50-yard pass from Peyton Manning (Mike Vanderjagt kick), 6:44. AFC 24–13. Drive: 7 plays, 72 yards, 3:23.
AFC – Tony Gonzalez 9-yard pass from Peyton Manning (Mike Vanderjagt kick), 0:54. AFC 31–13. Drive: 10 plays, 60 yards, 3:58.
3rd Quarter
AFC – Jamal Lewis 22-yard run (Mike Vanderjagt kick), 11:08. AFC 38–13. Drive: 8 plays, 71 yards, 3:52.
NFC – Torry Holt 12-yard pass from Marc Bulger (Jeff Wilkins kick), 8:08. AFC 38–20. Drive: 2 plays, 28 yards, 0:45.
NFC – Keenan McCardell 2-yard pass from Marc Bulger (Jeff Wilkins kick), 5:47. AFC 38–27. Drive: 3 plays, 7 yards, 1:20.
4th Quarter
AFC – Clinton Portis 23-yard pass from Trent Green (Mike Vanderjagt kick), 13:14. AFC 45–27. Drive: 5 plays, 81 yards, 2:28.
NFC – Alge Crumpler 33-yard pass from Marc Bulger (Jeff Wilkins kick), 12:54. AFC 45–34. Drive: 1 play, 33 yards, 0:20.
NFC – Shaun Alexander 5-yard pass from Marc Bulger (pass failed), 5:43. AFC 45–40. Drive: 8 plays, 88 yards, 4:16.
NFC – Dré Bly 32-yard interception return (Ahman Green run), 4:50. NFC 48–45.
NFC – Shaun Alexander 2-yard run (Jeff Wilkins kick), 3:32. NFC: 55–45. Drive: 1 play, 2 yards, 0:03.
AFC – Hines Ward 10-yard pass from Peyton Manning (Mike Vanderjagt kick), 1:54. NFC: 55–52. Drive: 9 plays, 78 yards, 1:38.

AFC roster

Offense

Defense

Special teams

NFC roster

Offense

Defense

Special teams

Notes:
Replacement selection due to injury or vacancy
Injured player; selected but did not play
Replacement starter; selected as reserve
"Need player"; named by coach

Number of selections per team

External links
Official Pro Bowl website at NFL.com

Pro Bowl
Pro Bowl
Pro Bowl
Pro Bowl
Pro Bowl
American football competitions in Honolulu
February 2004 sports events in the United States